Copelatus vanninii is a species of diving beetle. It is part of the subfamily Copelatinae in the family Dytiscidae. It was described by Bilardo & Rocchi in 1999.

References

vanninii
Beetles described in 1999